Chandon Pictures is an Australian comedy television series that premiered on Movie Extra on 10 November 2007 and ended on 7 May 2009.

The series featured sixteen episodes and was a spin-off from a Tropfest short film produced by Rob Carlton and Alex Weinress. It followed the misadventures of a struggling video production company called 'Chandon Pictures.' 
Rob Carlton, who plays the main character, is the younger cousin of Brian Carlton, The Spoonman talkback host on the Austereo Triple M network. This was revealed when The Spoonman interviewed Rob.

On 10 July 2008, it was announced that the series had won a second season and it had sold format rights to its distributor Lionsgate.

The first season premiered in the UK on Dave on 19 February 2009 in a 10pm slot. It was also aired in the US on the Sundance Channel.

Regular cast 
 Rob Carlton
 Josh Lawson
 Darren Gilshenan
 Rebecca Massey

Guest cast
 Graeme Blundell
 Angus Sampson
 Peter Phelps
 Justine Clarke
 Ed Kavalee
 Lachy Hulme
 Dan Wyllie

Episodes

Season 1 (2007)

Season 2 (2009)

Awards and nominations

Notes
 A ^  Directors - Rob Carlton & Alex Weinress
 B ^  Writer - Rob Carlton

References

External links 
 {{Official website|https://web.archive.org/web/20071114050618/http://www.movienetwork.tv/Chandon/%7D%7D
 
Chandon Pictures - "Champion Charles" at Australian Screen Online

Australian comedy television series
Movie Extra original programming
2007 Australian television series debuts
2009 Australian television series endings